Vasilovtsi (also Vasilovci or Wassilowzi) may refer to:

 Vasilovtsi, Montana Province
 Vasilovtsi, Sofia Province